The West Walker River is a tributary of the Walker River, approximately  long, in eastern California and western Nevada in the United States. It drains part of the Sierra Nevada range along the California-Nevada border in the watershed of Walker Lake in the Great Basin. The river derives its name from Joseph R. Walker, a mountain man.

It flows north, along the west side of the Sweetwater Mountains, emerging into the Antelope Valley, a ranching region around Walker. It flows north past Coleville and Topaz and enters southern Douglas County, Nevada southwest of Carson City. In Nevada it flows northeast, joining the East Walker River from the west 7 mi (11.3 km) south of Yerington to form the Walker River.

The river is heavily used for irrigation in the ranching valleys along its lower course. Its waters are diverted along its upper course to form Topaz Lake along the California-Nevada border. It receives the Little Walker River from the south near its source in the mountains.

U.S. Highway 395 passes through the West Walker River Valley, connecting it via Devil's Gate Pass to the East Walker River; Sonora Pass and Monitor Pass lead from the valley into the Sierra Nevada and the Carson River valley. In January 1997 a record-setting flood along the West Walker River destroyed  of U.S. 395. This section of road was rebuilt in six months. The silt carried by the river settled in Topaz Lake, hurting the trout population there.

See also
List of rivers in the Great Basin

Notes 

Rivers of Mono County, California
Rivers of Nevada
Rivers of Northern California
Rivers of the Great Basin
Rivers of Douglas County, Nevada